Carl Frank Macek (September 21, 1951 – April 17, 2010) was an American screenwriter, script editor, producer and voice actor on numerous English language adaptations of anime during the 1980s and 1990s. His work is considered by many to have been instrumental in creating mainstream awareness of Japanese animation in the United States.

Career

Robotech and Harmony Gold USA
Macek came to public attention in 1985 as the producer and story editor of the influential animated television series Robotech, which he produced for Harmony Gold USA. Robotech is considered one of the titles most responsible for igniting anime fandom in North America and internationally. Macek intended to produce a sequel to Robotech, Robotech II: The Sentinels, but this project was canceled. While at Harmony Gold, Macek also produced the little-known, rarely-seen Captain Harlock and the Queen of a Thousand Years (which combines the almost-unrelated stories of Space Pirate Captain Harlock and Queen Millennia).

Later career
Macek went on to co-found (with Jerry Beck) Streamline Pictures in 1988. Joining him were writers who had worked with him on Robotech, most notably, Steve Kramer, Tom Wyner, Gregory Snegoff, and Ardwight Chamberlain, each of whom are also experienced voice actors. Streamline Pictures was one of the first American companies to successfully deal in the regular production of imported Japanese animation. Among the titles released by Streamline are Lensman, Robot Carnival, Doomed Megalopolis, Twilight of the Cockroaches, Crying Freeman, Wicked City,  the Fist of the North Star film, Akira, Lupin III: Mystery of Mamo as well as the original English dub versions of Hayao Miyazaki's Lupin III: Castle of Cagliostro, Laputa: Castle in the Sky, My Neighbor Totoro, and Kiki's Delivery Service. As of 1993, Streamline Pictures distributed their anime through Orion Pictures and was eventually purchased by Orion in 1996. Both companies shut themselves down, but Orion was resurrected for television in 2013 and as a whole in 2014, all by Metro-Goldwyn-Mayer, while Streamline stays defunct.

He was working as a scriptwriter for the English dub of Naruto and Bleach for Viz Media, and consulting for Harmony Gold on Robotech: The Shadow Chronicles before his death.

Other works
Macek was a co-editor of McGill's Survey of the Cinema and Film Noir—An Encyclopedic Reference to the American Style (1979). He authored The Art of Heavy Metal: Animation for the Eighties and Robotech Art 3: The Sentinels in which he chronicles in detail the conception and what went wrong during the production of the latter aborted animated series. He also worked as a scriptwriter for the animated series C.O.P.S., was the executive consultant for the animated film Heavy Metal 2000, and wrote the animated adaptation of Brian Pulido's Lady Death.

Macek adapted the treatment by Merian C. Cooper (the producer of King Kong) for the unproduced film project War Eagles into a novel and screenplay in 2008. The book was published in the summer of 2008 by Angelgate Press.

Legacy in anime
Macek became one of the most controversial figures amongst English anime fandom. Streamline Pictures-dubbed anime were among the first to be available on home video as well as broadcast on cable. Over the years, he has seen his share of detractors and proponents, for while he did help to bring Japanese animation titles and series to the United States, his edits, re-rewrites and mash-ups (particularly The Robotech Saga) angered many fans of the original titles and series. To this day, anime fans still remain divided between appreciation and scorn for his work.

Death
Jerry Beck, one of Macek's former business partners, revealed that Macek died of a heart attack on Saturday, April 17, 2010.  Barely three months before his sudden death, Macek recorded a lengthy two-and-a-half-hour podcast interview with Anime News Network, offering an extensive retrospective on his entire career.

His brief obituary in the Los Angeles Times reported the place of death as Topanga Canyon. The obituary shows a picture of him surrounded by several Robotech characters from all three series. 

After Macek's death, a short documentary, Carl Macek's Robotech Universe, was produced.

Writer
 series head writer denoted in bold

Anime television series dubs
 Robotech (1985)
 Captain Harlock and the Queen of a Thousand Years (1985)
 Zillion (1990): eps 1-5
 Lupin the Third Part II (1993)
 Divergence Eve (2003)

Original television scripts
 COPS (1988-1989)

Anime film dubs
 Robotech: The Movie (1986)

OVA dubs
 Zillion: Burning Night (1988)
 Casshan: Robot Hunter (1995)

Live action dubs
 2009: Lost Memories (2000)
 Yesterday (2002)

Original film scripts
 Robotech II: The Sentinels (1988)
 Computer Warriors: The Adventure Begins (1990)
 Heavy Metal 2000 (2000)
 Lady Death: The Movie (2004)
 Robotech 3000 (2007)
 Robotech: Love Live Alive (2013)

Producer

Television
 Captain Harlock and the Queen of a Thousand Years (1985)
 Robotech (1985)
 Zillion (1990): eps 1-5
 Lupin the Third Part II (1993)
 A.D. Police: To Protect and Serve (2001)
 Divergence Eve (2003)

Anime films
 The Brave Frog (1985)
 The Brave Frog’s Great Adventure (1985)
 Codename: Robotech (1985)
 Robotech: The Movie (1986)
 Lily C.A.T (1987 Film)
 Akira (1989)
 Lensman (1990)
 Fist of the North Star (1991)
 Robot Carnival (1991)
 The Castle of Cagliostro (1992)
 Golgo 13: The Professional (1992)
 Neo Tokyo (1992)
 Twilight of the Cockroaches (1992)
 Vampire Hunter D (1993)
 Wicked City (1993)
 The Mystery of Mamo (1995)
 My Beautiful Girl, Mari (2002)

OVAs
 Zillion: Burning Night (1990)
 Silent Möbius (1992)
 8 Man After (1994)
 Crying Freeman (1994-1995): eps 1-5
 Doomed Megalopolis (1995)
 Casshan: Robot Hunter (1995)

Live action films
 Cyber Ninja (1988)
 Zeiram (1994)
 2009: Lost Memories (2000)
 Yesterday (2002)

Original films
 Computer Warriors: The Adventure Begins (1990)
 Robotech: Love Live Alive'' (2013)

References

External links
 
 

1951 births
2010 deaths
American casting directors
American film directors
American male screenwriters
American male television writers
American male voice actors
American storyboard artists
American television writers
California State University, Fullerton alumni
Robotech cast and crew
Screenwriters from Pennsylvania
Television producers from Pennsylvania
American voice directors
Writers from Pittsburgh